Fernando Telles Ribeiro (born April 12, 1938 in Guanabara, Rio de Janeiro) is a male diver from Brazil. He joined the Brazilian national diving squad at the age of 18, and competed at the 1956 Summer Olympics in Melbourne and the 1960 Summer Olympics in Rome. Ribeiro also won the South American Diving Championships four times, and competed in the Pan-American Games. He continues to compete in 'Masters' diving competitions, having obtained the title of World Masters' Champion at the Nike Olympic Games in Portland USA in 1998 and Champion of the North American Open Masters in Oxford, USA in 2000.

Education
Telles studied Civil Engineering at the Souza Marques University in Rio de Janeiro.

Awards
In June 2011, Telles was conferred with an honorary Doctorate of the Arts by the University of East London.

Notes

References

External links
 

1938 births
Living people
Brazilian male divers
Olympic divers of Brazil
Divers at the 1956 Summer Olympics
Divers at the 1960 Summer Olympics
20th-century Brazilian people